Mattia De Marchi (born 3 June 1991 in Mirano) is an Italian former professional cyclist.

Major results

2015
 1st Stage 4 Okolo Jižních Čech
 9th Overall Tour of Małopolska
2016
 1st GP Kranj
 1st Stage 4 Tour of China I
 7th Croatia–Slovenia
 8th Trofeo Edil C
 10th Gran Premio Industrie del Marmo

References

External links

1991 births
Living people
Italian male cyclists
People from Mirano
Cyclists from the Metropolitan City of Venice